Lightscreen is a lightweight screen shooting application for Microsoft Windows, used to automate the process of saving and cataloging screenshots. It operates as a hidden background process that is invoked with one (or multiple) hotkeys and then saves a screenshot file to disk according to the user's preferences. It has no built-in editing or annotation tools. Lightscreen has features to set a delay time and save screenshots in multiple image formats. A portable version is available

Current Website: https://lightscreen.com.ar/ As of August 20, 2020, Lightscreen is at Version 2.4 and the download is hosted on GitHub. It no longer appears to be using Sourceforge.net which is still hosting version 1.01 and was last updated 2014-04-15.

See also 

Screenshot

References

Free software programmed in C++
Screenshot software
Software that uses Qt
Windows-only free software